The Royal Commission on Genetic Modification was established by the New Zealand Government to look into and report on the issues surrounding genetic modification in New Zealand. The overall conclusion recommended a 'proceed, with caution' approach to the industry.

The Commission was chaired by Thomas Eichelbaum and it produced the Report of the Royal Commission on Genetic Modification in 2001.

See also
Genetic engineering in New Zealand

Political history of New Zealand
Environment of New Zealand
Royal commissions in New Zealand